Summer Beaver Airport  is located  southwest of the First Nations community of Nibinamik (Summer Beaver), Ontario, Canada.

Airlines and destinations

References

External links

Certified airports in Kenora District